The 2011–12 Fort Wayne Komets season was the second season in the Central Hockey League (CHL) and the 60th season overall in professional hockey of the CHL franchise in Fort Wayne, Indiana.

Regular season

Conference standings

Transactions
The Komets have been involved in the following transactions during the 2011–12 season.

Roster

See also
 2011–12 CHL season

References

External links
 2011–12 Fort Wayne Komets season at Pointstreak

F
F